The Brotherhood of Evil is a group of DC Comics supervillains, archenemies of the original Doom Patrol and the Teen Titans and enemies of the Justice League.

The Brotherhood of Evil appears in the third season of the HBO Max series Doom Patrol.

Publication history
The Brotherhood of Evil first appeared in The Doom Patrol #86 (March 1964) and were created by Arnold Drake and Bruno Premiani.

Fictional team history

Origins
The Brotherhood of Evil was founded by the enigmatic villain the Brain. In the beginning, the group's motivation was world domination. It has recently been revealed that Brain's true purpose for the Brotherhood was to destroy Niles Caulder and his "colleagues". Caulder murdered Brain so he could turn the scientist into Robotman without Brain's consent, but his plans were foiled by the Brain's creation, the super-intelligent gorilla Monsieur Mallah. Brain swore revenge against Caulder and his "pets", the Doom Patrol, who like Brain were often victims of experimentation in order to create an army of super-heroes through the ruining of innocent lives (several members were experiments of the Nazi war criminal known as General Zahl).

The original line-up consisted of the Brain, his chief henchman Monsieur Mallah, and their first recruit, the shapeshifter Madame Rouge. They fought the Doom Patrol on a regular basis and were later briefly joined by fellow Doom Patrol villains General Immortus and the alien Garguax. The group also was aided by the clumsy henchman Mr. Morden, who often operated robotic devices for the Brain including a robot called Rog (which was originally built by Niles Caulder).

The group's constant failure to defeat the Doom Patrol combined with the growing romantic attraction between Madame Rouge and Patrol leader Niles Caulder, led to Madame Rouge breaking free of the mental conditioning the Brain used to forcibly recruit her. Rouge quit the Brotherhood to join the Doom Patrol but the Brain quickly recaptured Madame Rouge and rebrainwashed her to make her evil personality dominant. The result backfired horribly on the Brain, as Madame Rouge turned against her evil teammates and launched a missile to destroy the Brain and Mallah.

Now aided by escaped Nazi war criminal Captain Zahl, Madame Rouge captured the members of the Doom Patrol and forced them to choose the horrible death of dying in a nuclear explosion in order to save a small Maine fishing village. The Doom Patrol reluctantly chose death and were apparently killed in the explosion.

Return
Madame Rouge and Zahl (now calling himself "General" Zahl) stayed in hiding for many years, gathering an army of minions for their next big plan, the invasion and conquest of the country of Zandia. Meanwhile, the Doom Patrol had reformed with Robotman as the only surviving original member. Along with Doom Patrol hanger-on Steve Dayton (AKA Mento), the two avoided going after Madame Rouge for the murders of Doom Patrol as they did not want to involve young Doom Patrol member Beast Boy in their vendetta. However, when Beast Boy (now calling himself "Changeling") joined the "New Teen Titans", the two adult Doom Patrol members went after Rouge. Both were defeated: Mento was tortured until he mentally broke down while Robotman was left deactivated and hung as a warning to trespassers outside their headquarters.

The New Teen Titans went looking for Robotman and Mento when Beast Boy had not heard back from them, which ultimately led to conflict with Rouge and Zahl. Surprisingly though, the heroes were aided by the Brain and Mallah and their new version of the Brotherhood of Evil. Brain and Mallah had predicted Rouge's betrayal and went into hiding, leaving decoys that Rouge ultimately destroyed. Rouge and Zahl both died while fighting Beast Boy and Robotman respectively. The Brain's new Brotherhood left the Titans, knowing that they would soon come into conflict.

The Brain and the new Brotherhood of Evil came into conflict with Brother Blood, whose life-restoring blood pits Brain sought to use to prolong his own life. To deal with Brother Blood's inhuman powers, the group repeatedly attacked the Titans in order to kidnap Raven and force her to aid them in defeating Brother Blood. They ultimately succeeded in kidnapping Raven with the Brain's influence and the fear manipulating power of  Phobia, briefly turning Raven to the Brotherhood's side. Unfortunately, in doing so, Raven's demonic father Trigon was able to gain control over Raven's body and nearly killed both the Titans and the Brotherhood, if not for the intervention of Donna Troy (who had been teleported outside the battlefield by Warp at the start of the fight).

The Brotherhood resurfaced again in Zandia, months later as the New Teen Titans were in a bitter battle to rescue Raven and team leader Nightwing (who was mind-controlled by Brother Blood while working undercover as Dick Grayson) from Brother Blood's cult. During the battle, Brain and Mallah finally got access to the blood pits of Brother Blood while the Brotherhood captured Jericho and tied him to a lightning rod to force a final showdown with the Titans, which they lost. Meanwhile, a cave-in trapped Mallah and Brain underground, separating them from their team.

Meanwhile, Mr. Morden, now transformed into Mr. Nobody, attempted to reform the Brotherhood in Paris, but eventually decided (having gone basically insane) that the name and focus of the group be changed to reflect the fact that "the universe is a drooling idiot with no fashion sense" - the Brotherhood of Dada was born. The Brotherhood of Dada would fight the Doom Patrol on two separate occasions before being permanently defeated.

Meanwhile, Brain and Mallah made their way to America, without the help of the Brotherhood of Evil. The two broke into the lair of the latest incarnation of Doom Patrol, in order to steal one of Robotman's spare bodies for the Brain. Now with a body, Brain declared his undying love for Mallah just as the spare body exploded (the robot body had gained sentience, a fact the two were unaware of, and had vowed to destroy itself rather than have a human brain inserted into it again).

The rest of the Brotherhood meanwhile rechristened themselves the "Society of Sin" and recruited a new female member named Trinity. This incarnation of the Brotherhood would only exist for one battle with the Titans before the group returned to their existing name and dropped Trinity from its roster.

In The New Titans #97-99, Brain and Mallah apparently returned to the Brotherhood with a shocking new member: Rita Farr, the sole member of the original Doom Patrol who had not came back to life at the time. The return was bittersweet though, as Brain was suffering from severe mental deterioration and Mallah proclaimed that only Mento's new Mento helmet could save the Brain. The group forced Changeling to steal the helmet for them in exchange for Brain helping restore Cyborg's mental capacities (Cyborg had become a brain dead automaton at this point in time). Changeling stole the helmet but quickly changed his mind about giving it to Brain, leading to "Rita Farr" to make her presence known and attack her son from behind while "Mallah" distracted Changeling with energy blast powers that the ape never possessed beforehand. This caused the Brotherhood to realize that the three were not who they claimed to be, leading to Warp escaping and bringing the Titans in to save Changeling and his teammates from the fake Elasti-Girl, Brain, and Mallah. Several weeks later, the three imposters attacked the Titans again and this time, they brought in an army of Titan villains with them, including a doppelganger of Plasma. This time the identities of the villains were revealed: they were energy beings who served a sentient alien computer called Technis which needed to assimilate Cyborg in order to survive.

Brotherhood lives again
The Brotherhood of Evil were not seen during the second half of the 1990s and would not return until 2005, in JSA Classified #1-3. Brain and Mallah themselves were magically resurrected a year prior to this during a Flash tie-in for Identity Crisis, having been revealed to be in jail for quite some time. The two were interrogated by the fifth incarnation of the Teen Titans for the location of Plasmus and Warp, as those two were suspects in the murder of Sue Dibny. It has been implied that the two were resurrected as a result of the same reality altering wave that erased the Doom Patrol from the timeline, resulting in the team only recently being formed by Caulder.

With Madame Rouge's daughter Gemini now a member, the group reunited with Phobia, Mallah, and Brain and joined the Secret Society of Super Villains, under the command of inner circle member Deathstroke. Deathstroke had the group acquire the mass murdering chemical monster Chemo for the Society and in Infinite Crisis #4, dropped the monster onto the city of Blüdhaven. Murdering several million people, the Brotherhood became the most wanted villains in the DC Universe for their act of mass murder. Furthermore, Warp was recruited by the villainous Doctor Psycho to free the murderous Doomsday for the Society as part of the group's final endgame against Earth's heroes.

After the one-year gap, between the end of Infinite Crisis and Teen Titans (vol. 3) #34 (the first issue of Teen Titans after the "One Year Gap") the Brotherhood has gained members "Elephant Man" and "Goldilocks" while losing Phobia, who opted to stay a freelance villain but still kept ties with the Brotherhood.

The Brotherhood then returned to their independent roots and launched a massive crime wave independent of the remains of the Secret Society of Super-Villains. Their goals included cloning a new body for the Brain as well as creating unstable clones of existing super-heroes to sell to third world dictatorships in Africa, putting the team in conflict with the Teen Titans, Doom Patrol, and the Outsiders.

The Brain, Monsieur Mallah, General Immortus, Phobia, Plasmus and Warp were later seen in the Salvation Run mini-series. In Salvation Run #4, the Brain and Mallah are killed by Gorilla Grodd. In the final issue, General Immortus is killed during a battle with Parademons but turned up alive in "Final Crisis Aftermath: Run." Plasmus and Warp are used by Lex Luthor as a power source for a teleportation device, and are seemingly killed when it self-destructs.

The New 52
In September 2011, The New 52 rebooted DC's continuity. In this new timeline, the Brotherhood of Evil is featured as its members Phobia, Plasmus, and Warp are competing against La Dama's agents to obtain the scarab. It ends up in the possession of Jaime Reyes who becomes Blue Beetle. Blue Beetle manages to fight off both villain groups. To ensure that Phobia, Plasmus, and Warp succeed in reclaiming the scarab, a robotic gorilla called Silverback is sent to meet up with them. Silverback warns the three villains that if they fail again, he will be the one who will "clean up the mess".

Membership

Here is a list of the Brotherhood of Evil members:

Brotherhood of Evil
 The Brain
 Monsieur Mallah
 Madame Rouge
 Garguax
 General Immortus

Second Brotherhood of Evil/Society of Sin
 The Brain
 Monsieur Mallah
 Phobia
 Houngan
 Plasmus
 Warp 
 Trinity
 Elasti-Girl - Revealed to be an impostor in The New Titans #103

Third Brotherhood of Evil
 The Brain
 Monsieur Mallah
 Gemini - Revealed in Batgirl #61
 Houngan
 Phobia - No longer a member as of Teen Titans (vol. 3) #34
 Plasmus
 Warp
 Elephant Man - Revealed in Teen Titans (vol. 3) #35
 Goldilocks - Revealed in Teen Titans (vol. 3) #35

Fourth Brotherhood of Evil
 Phobia
 Plasmus
 Silverback
 Warp

In other media

Television

 The Brotherhood of Evil appear in Teen Titans, consisting of the Brain, Monsieur Mallah, Madame Rouge and General Immortus. Initially fighting the Doom Patrol, they later recruit Doctor Light, Psimon, Cinderblock, Red X, Adonis, Trident, Puppet King, Johnny Rancid, Mumbo, Professor Chang, Plasmus, Angel, Warp, Phobia, Punk Rocket, Killer Moth, Kardiak, XL Terrestrial, Katarou, Atlas, André LeBlanc, Control Freak, Wintergreen, the I.N.S.T.I.G.A.T.O.R., the H.I.V.E. Headmistress, the H.I.V.E. Five, Wrestling Star, Kitten, Fang, Mad Mod, the Witch, Steamroller, Malchior, Mother Mae-Eye, Master of Games, Ding Dong Daddy, Newfu and Bob, Overload, Private H.I.V.E., and Cheshire to help them flash-freeze the "next generation of heroes" around the world. However, they are eventually defeated and flash-frozen themselves by the Teen Titans.
 The Brotherhood of Evil appears in Doom Patrol, consisting of the Brain and Monsieur Mallah, with Eric Morden as a former member from the 1940s and Madame Rouge attempting to join them until the Brain betrays her.

Miscellaneous
The Brotherhood of Evil appear in Teen Titans Go!. Additionally, a heroic, alternate universe version of the Brotherhood called the Brotherhood of Justice appear in issue #48, consisting of Doctor Light, Mammoth, Madame Rouge, and Psimon.

Bibliography
 The Brave and the Bold #65
 Doom Patrol #86-87, 90, 93, 96-97, 104, 111-112, 121
 Doom Patrol (vol. 4) #14
 The New Teen Titans #14-15, 28-21
 The New Teen Titans (vol. 2) #43
 The New Titans #97-99
 Secret Origins (vol. 2) Annual #1
 Teen Titans (vol. 2) #15
 Teen Titans (vol. 3) #35-37

References

1964 comics debuts
Characters created by Arnold Drake
Comic book terrorist organizations
Comics characters introduced in 1964